Siphesihle Qhamani 'Pitsa' Punguzwa (born 21 May 1993 in Butterworth) is a South African rugby union player for the  in the Currie Cup and in the Rugby Challenge. His regular position is flanker.

Career

Youth

Punguzwa represented his home province of Border at both the 2009 Under-16 Grant Khomo Week and the 2011 Under-18 Craven Week tournaments. He played in all nine matches of the  side's 2013 Under-21 Provincial Championship Division B campaign, making five starts and four substitute appearances and scoring eight tries, the joint-highest by a forward in the competition. He also played in their promotion/relegation play-off match against former side , but, despite scoring yet another try in the match, could not help  gain promotion to Division A.

Senior career

References

1993 births
Living people
People from Mnquma Local Municipality
Xhosa people
South African rugby union players
Eastern Province Elephants players
Rugby union flankers
Rugby union players from the Eastern Cape